Howard Beale may refer to:
 Howard Beale (politician) (1898–1983), Australian politician and Ambassador to the United States
 Howard K. Beale (1899–1959), American historian and author
 Howard Beale (Network), a character in the 1976 film, played by Peter Finch

See also
 Beale, a surname
 Beale (disambiguation)